is the 11th studio album by Japanese singer/songwriter Mari Hamada, released on October 19, 1991. It was Hamada's first release by MCA Victor, and includes contributions by Toto guitarist Steve Lukather. The album was reissued alongside Hamada's past releases on January 15, 2014.

Hamada's 1993 international release Introducing... Mari Hamada includes "Rainy Blue" and "Tomorrow". In addition, "Paradox" was rewritten in English as "Color Blind", while "More Than Ever" was given new lyrics for the album. The 1994 international follow-up All My Heart includes "Precious Summer" and a piano re-arrangement of "Missing", while "Tomorrow" was rewritten in English and given an acoustic arrangement as "Til Tomorrow".

Tomorrow peaked at No. 2 on Oricon's albums chart. It was also certified Platinum by the RIAJ. The 2014 reissue peaked at No. 278.

Track listing

Personnel 
 Michael Landau – guitar
 Steve Lukather – guitar
 Tim Pierce – guitar
 John Pierce – bass
 Randy Kerber – keyboards
 Robbie Buchanan – keyboards
 John Keane – drums 
 Efrain Toro – percussion
 Rick Palombi – backing vocals
 Seth Marsh – backing vocals
 Bernadette Barlow – backing vocals
 Natisse Bambi Jones – backing vocals

Charts

Certification

References

External links 
  (Mari Hamada)
  (Universal Music Japan)
 
 

1991 albums
Japanese-language albums
Mari Hamada albums
Universal Music Japan albums